Henry Wyndham Palmer (1826 – 10 May 1887) was a member of the Queensland Legislative Assembly.

Biography
Palmer was born in Armagh, Ireland, the son of Arthur Palmer and his wife Emily (née Hunter). His brother, Arthur Hunter Palmer went on to be Premier of Queensland. When he came to Australia he worked the gold mines of Charters Towers and also pastoral pursuits in both Queensland and New South Wales. He was a part owner of the Charters Towers Daily Herald. 
 
Palmer died in 1887 and was buried in the Charters Towers Pioneer Cemetery.

Public career
Palmer held the seat of Kennedy in the Queensland Legislative Assembly from 1878 until 1883. He was also an alderman and the town clerk in Charters Towers.

References

Members of the Queensland Legislative Assembly
1826 births
1887 deaths
19th-century Australian politicians
Irish emigrants to colonial Australia